John Henrik Gretton, 3rd Baron Gretton DL (9 February 1941 – 4 April 1989) was an English peer, owner of Stapleford Park in Leicestershire.

Gretton was born the son of The Hon. John Gretton, who became the 2nd Baron in 1947.

He was educated at Shrewsbury School.  He was farming when on 17 October 1970 he married Jennifer Ann Moore, only daughter of Edmund Moore, of York.  They lived at Holygate Farm, Stapleford, Leicestershire.  They had two children; Sarah Margaret Gretton (born 1971) and John Lysander Gretton, who would later succeed his father as 4th Baron.

He was Deputy Lieutenant of Leicestershire in 1986.

He inherited the title as the 3rd Baron on the death of his father in 1982.  Lord and Lady Gretton had issue:

 John Lysander Gretton, 4th Baron (17 Apr 1975- )
 Sarah Margaret (7 Dec 1971- )

Arms

References

 

Deputy Lieutenants of Leicestershire
People from the Borough of Melton
Barons in the Peerage of the United Kingdom
1941 births
1989 deaths